The R534 is a Regional Route in South Africa.

Route
It is a scenic detour of the north-south R532 to God's Window in Mpumalanga near the town of Graskop.

References

Regional Routes in Mpumalanga